Statistics of Swiss Super League in the 1928–29 season.

East

Table

Results

Central

Table

Results

West

Table

Results

Final

Table

Results 

|colspan="3" style="background-color:#D0D0D0" align=center|9 June 1929

|-
|colspan="3" style="background-color:#D0D0D0" align=center|16 June 1929

|-
|colspan="3" style="background-color:#D0D0D0" align=center|30 June 1929

Young Boys Bern won the championship.

Sources 
 Switzerland 1928-29 at RSSSF

Swiss Serie A seasons
Swiss
Football